The Crisp County School District is a public school district in Crisp County, Georgia, United States, based in Cordele. It serves the communities of Arabi and Cordele.

Schools
The Crisp County School District has one primary school, one elementary school, one middle school, and one high school.

Primary 
 Crisp County Primary

Elementary 
Crisp County Elementary

Middle school
Crisp County Middle School

High school
Crisp County High School

References

External links

School districts in Georgia (U.S. state)
Education in Crisp County, Georgia